L. Candy Ruff (February 13, 1951 - June 16, 2016) was an American politician who was a Democratic member of the Kansas House of Representatives, who represented the 40th District from 1993 to 2009.

Early life
L. Candy Williamson was born on February 13, 1951, in Springfield, Missouri, to Lyndall C. and Eleanor Burtner Williamson. She was one of five children, graduating from Parkview High School in Springfield in 1969. After high school she graduated from the University of Kansas with a bachelor's degree and then a master's degree. Candy also attended the University of Missouri–Kansas City, and in 2012 earned her doctorate from the University of Kansas. Following college, she worked as a journalist for the Leavenworth Times between 1982 and 1992.

References

External links
Follow the Money - Candy Ruff
2006 2004 2002 2000 1998 1996 campaign contributions

Democratic Party members of the Kansas House of Representatives
1951 births
2016 deaths
Women state legislators in Kansas
Politicians from Springfield, Missouri
Politicians from Leavenworth, Kansas
University of Kansas alumni
University of Missouri–Kansas City alumni
20th-century American women politicians
20th-century American politicians
21st-century American women politicians
21st-century American politicians